"The Shadow of Love" is a single by English rock band the Damned, released by MCA on 10 June 1985.

It was released in several formats, with the 10" and 12" versions featuring different mixes of "The Shadow of Love", as well as a bonus track, "Would You". Limited numbers of the 7" single included a bonus record, featuring Rat Scabies' solo single "Let There Be Rats", previously only available via mail order. The song was promoted with the help of a video directed by Peter Cornish, and reached No. 25 in the UK charts.

MCA also issued the single in Germany, with the German 7" featuring a slightly different mix of "The Shadow of Love".

Track listing
 "The Shadow of Love" (Jugg, Scabies, Vanian, Merrick) - 3:51
 "Nightshift" (Jugg, Scabies, Vanian, Merrick)

7-inch Double Pack: 
  "The Shadow Of Love" (Jugg, Scabies, Vanian, Merrick)
 "Nightshift" (Jugg, Scabies, Vanian, Merrick)
 "Let there Be Rats" (Scabies)
 "Wiped Out' (Scabies)

10-inch version: 
 "The Shadow of Love (Ten Inches of Hell Mix)" (Jugg, Scabies, Vanian, Merrick) - 6:32
"Nightshift" (Jugg, Scabies, Vanian, Merrick)
 "Would You" (Mason, Scabies, Jugg, Vanian, Merrick)

12-inch version:
 "The Shadow of Love (Pressure Mix)" (Jugg, Scabies, Vanian, Merrick) - 6:32
 "Nightshift" (Jugg, Scabies, Vanian, Merrick)
 "Would You" (Mason, Scabies, Jugg, Vanian, Merrick)

Production credits
Producers
 Jon Kelly on "The Shadow of Love"
 The Damned on "Nightshift" and "Would You"
Musicians
 Dave Vanian − vocals
 Rat Scabies − drums
 Roman Jugg − guitar, keyboards
 Bryn Merrick − bass
 Vivian Mason – vocals on "Would You"

External links

1985 singles
The Damned (band) songs
Songs written by Rat Scabies
Songs written by Roman Jugg
Songs written by David Vanian
Songs written by Bryn Merrick
1985 songs
MCA Records singles